Amanakkanthondi is a village in the Udayarpalayam taluk of Ariyalur district, Tamil Nadu, India.

Demographics 

As per the 2001 census, Amanakkanthondi had a total population of 1111 with 534 males and 577 females.

References

External links
 District map with village
 Drinking water coverage

Villages in Ariyalur district